The National Heritage Board (NHB) is a statutory board under the Ministry of Culture, Community and Youth (MCCY) of the Government of Singapore. It was formed on 1 August 1993.

National Museums and Heritage Institutions 
The National Heritage Board operates the following national museums and heritage institutions.

 Museums
 Asian Civilisations Museum
 National Museum of Singapore
 Peranakan Museum
 Singapore Philatelic Museum (to be rebranded as Children's Museum Singapore)
 Reflections at Bukit Chandu

 Heritage Institutions
 Language
 Preservation of Sites and Monuments
 Heritage Conservation Centre - architecture and building project

 Indian Heritage Centre
 Malay Heritage Centre
 Sun Yat Sen Nanyang Memorial Hall

Museum Roundtable
The Museum Roundtable is an initiative led by NHB since 1996.

There are more than 50 members for this initiative, consisting of public and private museums, heritage galleries and attractions in Singapore such as the Singapore Art Museum, the National Museum of Singapore, the Asian Civilisations Museum, the Science Centre Singapore and the National Library of Singapore.

It regularly organises joint-events with the NHB and other private and public partners in an attempt to elevate Singapore's heritage and museological landscape. Examples of such key events are International Museum Day, which is held annually in May, and Children's Season, which aims to cultivate museum-going interests in children with exhibits and installations at various participating museums.

Publications 

 - The collector's edition

References

Further reading

External links
Museum Roundtable
National Heritage Board within Google Arts & Culture

 

1993 establishments in Singapore
Government agencies established in 1993
Statutory boards of the Singapore Government